Les Moutiers-en-Auge (literally Les Moutiers in Auge) is a commune in the department of Calvados in the Normandy region in northwestern France.

Les Moutiers-en-Auge is located at the junction of the D90 and D249 departmental roads.

Population

See also
Communes of the Calvados department

References

Communes of Calvados (department)
Calvados communes articles needing translation from French Wikipedia